A spinal neuron is a neuron in the spinal cord.

Some spinal neurons are heteromeric, i.e. they have processes pass over to the opposite side of the spinal cord

References

Spinal cord
Neurons